Victor Manosalvas (born 14 December 1992) is an Ecuadorian professional footballer who plays as a midfielder.

Career

Youth and college
Manosalvas played for the New York Red Bulls Academy since 2009. In 2009, he was a member of the U-18 squad and was named Academy Player of the Year. Manosalvas also played  college soccer for Seton Hall University from 2010 to 2014. While with the Pirates he played in 59 matches scoring 7 goals and recording 10 assists.
  
During the 2014 season Manosalvas played for the New York Red Bulls U-23 in the National Premier Soccer League. He helped lead the team in capturing the 2014 NPSL title and was recognized as the league player of the year and top scorer.

Professional
Manosalvas signed with New York Red Bulls II for the 2015 season and made his debut as a starter for the side in its first ever match on March 28, 2015, in a 0–0 draw with Rochester Rhinos. On July 18, 2015, Manosalvas recorded his first assist for the club in a 2–0 victory over Harrisburg City Islanders.

International
In 2006 Manosalvas represented Ecuador at the U-15 national team level.

References

External links 
shupirates.com player profile 
npsl.info New York Red Bulls U-23 Statistics 2014

1992 births
Living people
People from Quevedo, Ecuador
Ecuadorian footballers
Ecuadorian expatriate footballers
Seton Hall Pirates men's soccer players
New York Red Bulls U-23 players
New York Red Bulls II players
Association football midfielders
Expatriate soccer players in the United States
USL Championship players